The Apollo Barberini is a 1st–2nd-century Roman sculpture of Apollo Citharoedus.  It is a probable copy of the sculpture of Apollo Citharoedus (possibly by Scopas and perhaps from the sanctuary of Apollo at Rhamnus, in Attica) that was the cult statue in the temple of Apollo Palatinus in Rome.  

It is named after the Barberini who acquired it.  It is now held in the Munich Glyptothek (Inv. 211).

See also
Other items from the Barberini collections:
Barberini Faun
Portland Vase

Sources
Linda Jones Roccos, 'Apollo Palatinus: The Augustan Apollo on the Sorrento Base', American Journal of Archaeology, Vol. 93, No. 4 (Oct., 1989), pp. 571-588

Sculptures of Apollo
Barberini collection
Roman copies of Greek sculptures
Archaeological discoveries in Italy
Musical instruments in art